Cìr Mhòr (Scottish Gaelic, usually with definite article, A' Chìr Mhòr) is a Corbett known as the Matterhorn of Arran. Its name means the "big comb", referring its resemblance to a cockscomb. It is separated from the island's highest peak, Goat Fell, by a col called The Saddle.

Marilyns of Scotland
Mountains and hills of the Isle of Arran
Corbetts